Greg Hawthorne (born September 5, 1956) is a former American football player with the National Football League (NFL).  Drafted out of Baylor University, Hawthorne played nine seasons with the Pittsburgh Steelers. As a rookie, he won a Super Bowl ring with the Steelers in Super Bowl XIV over the Los Angeles Rams.  He also played for the New England Patriots (including playing in Super Bowl XX), and for the Indianapolis Colts.  In the 1985 AFC Championship game, as a member of the Patriots, Hawthorne recovered a Dolphins fumble that was pivotal in the Patriots upset victory. 

As a running back, tight end, and wide receiver, he accumulated 527 rushing yards and 92 receptions between 1979 and 1987.

References

External links
Career stats

1956 births
Living people
Players of American football from Fort Worth, Texas
American football running backs
American football tight ends
American football wide receivers
Baylor Bears football players
Pittsburgh Steelers players
New England Patriots players
Indianapolis Colts players
National Football League replacement players